He Who Rides a Tiger is a 1965 British crime drama directed by Charles Crichton, and starring Tom Bell and Judi Dench.

Background

The film was based on the real-life cat-burglar Peter Scott. The title was derived from the Indian proverb, "He who rides a tiger can never jump off," and implies that the main character cannot escape from his way of life.

Crichton called making the film "a bad experience" because "the producer was a shit, a cheat and a bastard."

Cast

References

External links
 

1965 films
Films directed by Charles Crichton
British crime drama films
Films set in London
Films set in England
1960s English-language films
1960s British films
1965 crime drama films